An English topographic name for someone who lived on an outlying farm; it is a modern variation of the Anglo-Saxon wic. The surname is also of German origin.

People
 Cole Wick (born 1993), American athlete and NFL player 
 Denis Wick (born 1932), British orchestral trombonist 
 Douglas Wick (born 1954), American movie producer
 Emily Wick, American academic and MIT professor 
 Frances Wick (1875–1941), American physicist
 Gian-Carlo Wick (1909–1992), Italian theoretical physicist
 Hal Wick (1944–2018), American politician
 Helmut Wick (1915–1940), German Luftwaffe fighter pilot
 John Wick (game designer)
 John Wick, a whistleblower responsible for the disclosure of expenses of British Members of Parliament
 Rowan Wick (born 1992), Canadian baseball player
 Stan Wick, (born 1984) Swiss-born Irish ice hockey centre, currently contracted to  HC Ambrí-Piotta. 
 Walter Wick (born 1953), American artist and photographer 
 William W. Wick (1796–1868), American politician, United States Congressman, and Secretary of State of Indiana 
 Milton I. Wick, American newspaper businessman who founded Wick Communications Company.
 Hilton Wick (1920–2006), American politician and Vermont Senator
 Temperance Wick, American heroine

Fictional characters
 John Wick, titular character of the eponymous film series, and films John Wick: Chapter 1 (2014), John Wick: Chapter 2 (2017) and John Wick: Chapter 3 – Parabellum (2019).

See also
Wick (disambiguation)
Wicks (surname)

English-language surnames
German-language surnames
Surnames from given names